Cowper (pronounced Cowper or Cooper depending on family) is a surname of several persons:
 Austen Cowper (1885–1960), South African cricketer
 Bob Cowper (born 1940), Australian cricketer
 Sir Charles Cowper (1807–1875), Australian politician
 Charles Cowper Jr. (1834–1911), Australian politician, son of Sir Charles Cowper Snr.
 David Scott Cowper (born 1942), British yachtsman
 Douglas Cowper (1817–1839), British painter
 E. E. Cowper (1859–1933), British author
 Edward Alfred Cowper (1819–1893), British mechanical engineer and metallurgist
 Frances Maria Cowper (née Madan; sometimes known as Maria Frances; 1726-1797), British poet 
 Francis Thomas de Grey Cowper, 7th Earl Cowper
 Frank Cowper (1849–1930), British yachtsman and author
 Frank Cadogan Cowper (1877–1958), British artist
 Gerry Cowper (born 1958), British actress
 Mary Cowper (1625–1784), British courtier and diarist
 Nicola Cowper (born 1967), British actress
 Peter Cowper (1902–1962), English footballer of the 1920s and 1930s
 Phipps Coles Cowper (1819–1870), English naval captain and inventor
 Richard Cowper, pseudonym of John Middleton Murry Jr.
 Robert Cowper (1465–1539/40), English composer
 Sarah Cowper (1644–1720), English diarist
 Spencer Cowper (1670–1728), British MP and barrister
 Spencer Cowper (priest) 1713–1774, Dean of Durham Cathedral
 Steve Cowper (born 1938), American politician and governor of Alaska
 William Cowper of Galloway (1568–1619), Scottish bishop
 William Cowper (1731–1800), English poet and hymnodist
 William Cowper, 1st Earl Cowper (1665–1723), Lord Chancellor of England
 William Cowper (anatomist), English anatomist (1666–1709), see also Cowper's gland and Cowper's fluid
 William Cowper-Temple, 1st Baron Mount Temple (1811–1888), British politician and courtier
 William C. Cooper (actor) (1853-1918), stage and film actor

See also
 Earl Cowper, a title in the Peerage of Great Britain

Occupational surnames
English-language occupational surnames